Christopher Verbist (born 8 October 1991) is a Belgian professional football player who is currently playing for Solières  in the Belgian Second Amateur Division. His position on the field is on the right, either as a winger or as a wingback.

Career
In 2009, he played in two friendlies for the Belgium U19s.

Verbist played his first match in the Belgian Pro League with Standard Liège on the very last matchday of the 2009–10 season, but as he only got two appearances in the following season, he was loaned out to Belgian Second Division team Charleroi, where he played often. With Charleroi, he won the second division title, achieving promotion. However, as the loan ended, he was released by Standard, allowing him to sign with OH Leuven. During the 2012–13 season, Verbist only featured in two matches for OHL and as he was looking for more playing time, he was loaned out to second division team Lommel United for the 2013–14 season. The following season, he moved on permanent basis to RC Mechelen but was allowed to leave towards the end of 2014 as the team was having financial difficulties. In February 2015, he signed for FC Wiltz 71.

References

External links
 
 

Living people
1991 births
Belgian footballers
Standard Liège players
R. Charleroi S.C. players
Oud-Heverlee Leuven players
Lommel S.K. players
K.R.C. Mechelen players
FC Wiltz 71 players
Association football wingers
Belgian Pro League players
Challenger Pro League players
Belgium youth international footballers